Susan Walker Hammer (December 21, 1938 – March 7, 2020) was an American politician and member of the  Democratic Party, who served as the mayor of San Jose, California, from 1991 to 1999. She was voted best local politician six times.  Previous to serving as mayor, she represented San Jose City Council District Three, which encompassed the downtown area of the city, from 1983 to 1991.

Hammer was born in Altadena, California, on December 21, 1938.  She attended the University of California, Berkeley.  She was married to San Jose attorney Philip Hammer, and had three children and six grandchildren. She was diagnosed with Alzheimer's disease in her later years, and it progressed rapidly over the last several months of her life, leading to her death on March 7, 2020.

See also
1990 San Jose mayoral election
1994 San Jose mayoral election

References 

Mayors of San Jose, California
1938 births
2020 deaths
People from Altadena, California
California Democrats
University of California, Berkeley alumni
Women mayors of places in California
21st-century American women